Merrifieldia bystropogonis is a moth of the family Pterophoridae that is found on the Canary Islands and Madeira.

The forewings are slightly grey shaded. The hindwings and abdomen are brownish-grey.

The larvae feed on Bystropogon plumosus. They draw together the leaves and young flower-buds on the leading shoots of their host plant.

References

Moths described in 1908
bystropogonis
Moths of Africa